Eumelea is a genus of moths in the family Geometridae. It was described by James Duncan and John O. Westwood in 1841. Species are confined to Austro-Malayan subregions and throughout China, India, Sri Lanka and Myanmar.

Description
Palpi upturned, the second joint thickly scaled and third joint porrect (extended forward) and naked. Antennae very long and slender. Legs long and slender. Hind tibia fringed with hair. Forewings with vein 3 from before angle of cell. Vein 7 to 9 stalked from upper angle and vein 11 anastomosing (fusing) with vein 12 and then with vein 10. Hindwings with vein 3 from before angle of cell and vein 5 from middle of discocellulars. Vein 6, 7 stalked.

Species
 Eumelea biflavata Warren, 1896
 Eumelea djingga Sommerer, 1995
 Eumelea duponchelii (Montrouzier, 1856)
 Eumelea feliciata Guenée, 1857
 Eumelea florinata Guenée, 1857
 Eumelea genuina Kirsch 1877
 Eumelea ludovicata Guenée, 1857
 Eumelea obesata Felder & Rogenhofer, 1875
 Eumelea parda Sommerer, 1995
 Eumelea rosalia (Stoll, [1781])
 Eumelea rubrifusa Warren, 1896
 Eumelea stipata Turner, 1930
 Eumelea unilineata Warren, 1897

References

Desmobathrinae